Mexico–Pakistan relations are the diplomatic relations between Mexico and Pakistan. Both nations are members of the United Nations and the World Trade Organization.

History 
In August 1947, the Dominion of Pakistan (today the Islamic Republic of Pakistan and modern-day Bangladesh) obtained its independence from the British Empire. On 19 January 1955, Mexico and Pakistan established diplomatic relations. In May 1974, Pakistan opened an embassy in Mexico City. In 2007, Mexico opened an embassy in Islamabad, however, due to budget restraints, the embassy closed in 2009 and in its place, honorary consulates were opened in Karachi and Lahore.

In December 2004, Pakistani President Pervez Musharraf paid an official visit to Mexico and met with Mexican President Vicente Fox. In September 2015, the Mexican Senate held a "Week of Pakistan" to celebrate 60 years of diplomatic relations between both nations.

High-level visits
High-level visits from Mexico to Pakistan
 Foreign Undersecretary Lourdes Aranda Bezaury (2007)

High-level visits from Pakistan to Mexico
 President Pervez Musharraf (2004)
 Foreign Vice-Minister Burhanul Islam (2015)
 Ahsan Iqbal, Minister of Interior and Minister of Planning, Development and Reform (2018)
 Saleem Mandviwala, Deputy Chairman, Senate of Pakistan as Head of a Joint Parliamentary Delegation for an IPU Seminar(2019)

Bilateral agreements
Both nations have signed a few bilateral agreements such as an Agreement on the Elimination of Visas for Diplomatic and Official Passport Holders (2008); Memorandum of Understanding between the Mexican Secretariat of Agriculture, Livestock, Rural Development, Fisheries and Food and the Pakistani Ministry of National Food Security and Research for the Exportation of Rice to Mexico (2008) and an Agreement on Scientific and Technical Cooperation (2015).

Trade relations 
In 2018, two-way trade between both nations amounted to US$269 million. Mexico's main exports to Pakistan include: plastic industrial tubes and automotive parts. Pakistan's main exports to Mexico include: textiles, long grain rice, cotton and surgical instruments. Pakistan is Mexico's 67th biggest global trading partner while Mexico is Pakistan's 49th biggest global trading partner, respectively.

Resident diplomatic missions 

 Mexico is accredited to Pakistan from its embassy in Tehran, Iran and maintains honorary consulates in Karachi and Lahore.
 Pakistan has an embassy in Mexico City.

See also 
 Overseas Pakistani

References

 
Pakistan
Bilateral relations of Pakistan